YiSheng Liquor is a type of Chinese liquor.

History

Zhang_Jian, with the support of Zhang Zhidong (张之洞),set up a liquor company named YiSheng Liquor Making Company. This company was on the west side of the Number One Scholar Street, in ChangLe Town(常乐镇), Haimen.

References

Chinese distilled drinks